NHS Ayrshire and Arran is one of the fourteen regions of NHS Scotland. It was formed on 1 April 2004.

It has a responsibility to provide health and social care to almost 400,000 people with an operating budget of around £700 million (for 2013–2014), and planned budgets of £720 (for 2019-2020), £762.4 million (for 2020-2021) and £774.5 million (for 2021-2022).

Services

The health board has almost 6,000 staff working in their hospitals, and almost 2,500 staff working in the community.

It is also responsible for the care provided by:

 300 general practitioners and their teams at 90 sites
 98 community pharmacies
 160 dentists at more than 70 sites
 60 ophthalmic practices

Hospitals
 List of hospitals in Scotland (NHS Ayrshire and Arran section)

East Ayrshire area 
East Ayrshire Community Hospital, Cumnock
Kirklandside Hospital, Hurlford
University Hospital Crosshouse, Crosshouse, Kilmarnock

North Ayrshire area 
Arran War Memorial Hospital, Lamlash, Isle of Arran
Ayrshire Central Hospital, Irvine
Brooksby House Hospital, Largs
Lady Margaret Hospital, Millport, Isle of Cumbrae
Woodland View, Irvine

South Ayrshire area 
Ailsa Hospital, Ayr
Biggart Hospital, Prestwick
Girvan Community Hospital, Girvan
University Hospital Ayr

Emergency Departments (ED)
 
Only three hospitals within the NHS Ayrshire and Arran have a designated emergency department (ED), previously known as Accident and Emergency (A&E). University Hospital Crosshouse has a large department which was opened in the early 2000s. The Emergency Department at University Hospital Ayr was marked for closure, with the emergency department proposed to move from Ayr to University Hospital Crosshouse. This plan was eventually abolished, and University Hospital Ayr continues to have an emergency department, as does the Arran War Memorial Hospital on the Isle of Arran. Under the Scottish Government’s Mental Health Strategy 2017-2027 a new National Secure Adolescent Inpatient Service has been approved and is expected to open in 2022. It will be named Foxgrove and will be located at Ayrshire Central Hospital Campus in Irvine.

Performance
In May 2015 only 88% of patients attending the Boards A&E departments were seen within the four-hour target. This was the worst performance of all the Scottish health boards.

The Health and Social Care Partnership in Ayrshire and Arran established three community wards to manage high-risk patients with heart problems and diabetes in 2016. This reduced emergency hospital admissions by 40% in the first six months of operation.

Nicola McIvor, catering production & services manager, was awarded Caterer of the Year in April 2017 at the annual Hospital Caterers Association awards.  The  production and services department won the Staff, Health and Wellbeing award.

References

External links 
 

 
Ayrshire
Isle of Arran
2004 establishments in Scotland
Health in Ayrshire